Sharon Jackson served on the 31st Alaska House of Representatives on behalf of House District 13 from 2019 to 2021.

Early life
Jackson was born in Philadelphia, Pennsylvania. She attended high school in Pottsgrove, Pennsylvania and Charter College in Anchorage, Alaska.

Career
She served in the U.S. Army from 1982-1988. In 2015, Jackson served as the Alaska representative for the Republican National Convention. Prior to election she worked as a liaison connecting U.S. Senator Dan Sullivan to his constituents and veterans.

Personal life
She cites her special interests as God, family, and community service.

In 2015, she was hospitalized due to a stroke, resulting in aphasia.

References

External links
 Official legislature website
 Vote Smart - Biography
 Jackson for Lt. Governor, Official Website

Living people
African-American state legislators in Alaska
Republican Party members of the Alaska House of Representatives
Military personnel from Philadelphia
Politicians from Philadelphia
Women state legislators in Alaska
Year of birth missing (living people)
21st-century American politicians
21st-century American women politicians
21st-century African-American women
21st-century African-American politicians